Ben Storey (born April 1, 1974) is a Canadian lightweight rower. He won a gold medal at the 2000 World Rowing Championships in Zagreb with Edward Winchester in the lightweight men's coxless pair.

References

1974 births
Living people
Canadian male rowers
World Rowing Championships medalists for Canada